

The SECAT RG-60 was a prototype light sporting biplane built in France shortly after World War II. It was a conventional single-seat design with an open cockpit. The lower wing had a smaller span and chord than the upper wing and was braced against the upper wing and against the fuselage sides with I-struts but no wires. The undercarriage consisted of two fixed, divided main units plus a fixed tailskid. Power was supplied by a tractor-mounted piston engine that drove a two-bladed propeller. Construction was of wood throughout.

History
The RG-60 was displayed together with other SECAT designs at the Semaine de l'Aviation légère (light aviation week) held at Toussus-le-Noble from 22 April 1947 but was already somewhat outdated by the standards of the time. SECAT produced no further examples, and if the RG-60 ever received a civil registration, the details are now lost.

Specifications

Notes

References
 
 
 
 

1940s French sport aircraft
SECAT aircraft
Single-engined tractor aircraft
Biplanes